Spoken English shows great variation across regions where it is the predominant language. For example, the United Kingdom has the largest variation of accents of any country in the world, and therefore no single "British accent" exists. This article provides an overview of the numerous identifiable variations in pronunciation; such distinctions usually derive from the phonetic inventory of local dialects, as well as from broader differences in the Standard English of different primary-speaking populations.

Accent is the part of dialect concerning local pronunciation. Vocabulary and grammar are described elsewhere; see the list of dialects of the English language. Secondary English speakers tend to carry over the intonation and phonetics of their mother tongue in English speech. For more details on this, see non-native pronunciations of English.

Primary English speakers show great variability in terms of regional accents. Examples such as Pennsylvania Dutch English are easily identified by key characteristics, but others are more obscure or easily confused. These sub-dialects are very similar to each other, but non-local listeners can identify firm differences. On the other side of the spectrum, Australia has a General Australian accent which remains almost unchanged over thousands of miles.

English accents can differ enough to create room for misunderstandings. For example, the pronunciation of "pearl" in some variants of Scottish English can sound like the entirely unrelated word "petal" to an American. For a summary of the differences between accents, see the International Phonetic Alphabet chart for English dialects.

Overview

English dialects differ greatly in their pronunciation of open vowels. In Received Pronunciation, there are four open back vowels, but in General American there are only three, and in most dialects of Canadian English only two, . In addition, which words have which vowel varies between dialects. Words like bath and cloth have the vowels  in Received Pronunciation, but  in General American. The table above shows some of these dialectal differences.

Britain and Ireland

Accents and dialects vary widely across Great Britain, Ireland and nearby smaller islands. The UK has the most local accents of any English speaking country. As such, a single "British accent" does not exist. However, someone could be said to have an English, Scottish, Welsh or Irish accent, although these all have many different sub-types.

England

Southern England

There are considerable variations within the accents of English across England, one of the most obvious being the trap–bath split of the southern half of the country.

Two main sets of accents are spoken in the West Country, namely Cornish and West Country spoken primarily in the counties of Devon, Somerset, Gloucestershire, Bristol, Dorset (not as common in Dorset), and Wiltshire (again, less common in eastern Wiltshire). However, a range of variations can be heard within different parts of the West Country: the Bristolian dialect is distinctive from the accent heard in Gloucestershire (especially south of Cheltenham), for example.
The Cornwall accent has an east–west variation with the East of the county having influences from West country English and the West of the county having direct influences from the Cornish language.

There is also great variation within Greater London, with various accents such as Cockney, Estuary English, Multicultural London English and Received Pronunciation being found all throughout the region and the Home Counties.

Other accents are those of
 the East Midlands (Derby, Leicester and Rutland, Lincoln, Northampton, and Nottingham),
 East Anglia (Norfolk, Suffolk and Cambridgeshire) and
 the Home Counties (typically Buckinghamshire, Essex, Hertfordshire, Berkshire, Surrey, Kent, Hampshire). The Essex accent has an east–west variation with the  county's west having Estuary English speech features and the county's east having the traditional Essaxon features.
 A range of accents are spoken in the West Midlands (in the major towns and conurbations (The Black Country, Birmingham, Coventry, Stoke-on-Trent (considered by many to have tones of scouse) and Wolverhampton) and in rural areas (such as in Herefordshire and south Worcestershire).

On 20 February 2019, the New York Times published a quiz that maps the geographical differences between British and Irish dialects.

Northern England
The accents of Northern England have a range of regional variations.

Cumbria has regional variants in Western Cumbria (Workington), Southern Cumbria (Barrow-in-Furness) and Carlisle.

Modern Northumbrian has local variants in Northern Northumberland (Berwick-upon-Tweed), Eastern Northumberland (Ashington) and Newcastle, Sunderland and Mid-County Durham and Southern County Durham. A specialist dialect called Pitmatic is within this group, found across the region, it includes terms specific to coal mining.

Yorkshire is also distinctive, having regional variants around Leeds, Bradford, Hull, Middlesbrough, Sheffield, and York. Although many Yorkshire accents sound similar, accents in areas around Hull and Middlesbrough are markedly different. Due to this, the Middlesbrough accent is sometimes grouped with Modern Northumbrian accents being a mid-way between the two regions.

The Hull accent's rhythm is more like that of northern Lincolnshire than that of the rural East Riding, perhaps due to migration from Lincolnshire to the city during its industrial growth. One feature that it does share with the surrounding rural area is that an /aɪ/ sound in the middle of a word often becomes an /ɑː/: for example, "five" may sound like "fahve", "time" like "tahme".

Historic Lancashire, with regional variants in Bolton, Burnley, Blackburn, Manchester, Preston, Blackpool, Liverpool and Wigan. Many of the Lancashire accents may sound similar to outsiders, with the exception of Manchester and Wigan, where an older dialect has been maintained.

The Liverpool accent, known as Scouse, is an exception to the Lancashire regional variant of English; it has also spread to some of the surrounding towns. Before the 1840s, Liverpool's accent was similar to others in Lancashire, though with some distinct features due to the city's proximity to Wales. However, the city's population of around 60,000 was swelled in the 1840s by the arrival of around 300,000 Irish refugees escaping the Great Famine, as Liverpool was England's main Atlantic port and a popular departure point for people leaving for a new life in the United States. While many of the Irish refugees moved away, a vast amount remained in Liverpool and permanently influenced the local accent.

Scotland
The regional accents of Scottish English generally draw on the phoneme inventory of the dialects of Modern Scots, a language spoken by around 30% of the Scottish population with characteristic vowel realisations due to the Scottish vowel length rule.
Highland English accents are more strongly influenced by Scottish Gaelic than other forms of Scottish English.

Wales

The accents of English in Wales are strongly influenced by the phonology of the Welsh language, which more than 20% of the population of Wales speak as their first or second language. The North Wales accent is distinct from South Wales; North East Wales is influenced by Scouse and Cheshire accents; while South East Wales accents are influenced by West Country accents. The Wenglish of the South Wales Valleys shows a deep cross-fertilisation between the two.

The Cardiff dialect and accent is also quite distinctive from that of the South Wales Valleys, primarily:

Isle of Man
Manx English has its own distinctive accent, influenced to some extent by the Lancashire dialect and to a lesser extent by some variant of Irish English.

Ireland

Ireland has several main groups of accents, including (1) the accents of Ulster, with a strong influence from Scotland as well as the underlying Gaelic linguistic stratum, which in that province approaches the Gaelic of Scotland, (2) those of Dublin and surrounding areas on the east coast where English has been spoken since the earliest period of colonisation from Britain, and (3) the various accents of west, midlands and south.

Ulster

The Ulster accent has two main sub accents, namely Mid Ulster English and Ulster Scots. The language is spoken throughout the nine counties of Ulster, and in some northern areas of bordering counties such as Louth and Leitrim. It bears many similarities to Scottish English through influence from the Ulster varieties of Scots.
Some characteristics of the Ulster accent include:

The vowel is a high central rounded vowel, .
 In Belfast,  is a monophthong in open syllables (e.g. day ) but an ingliding diphthong in closed syllables (e.g. daze ). But the monophthong remains when inflectional endings are added, thus daze contrasts with days .
 The alveolar stops  become dental before , e.g. tree and spider
  often undergoes flapping to  before an unstressed syllable, e.g. eighty

Connacht, Leinster, and Munster

The accent of these three provinces fluctuates greatly from the flat tone of the midlands counties of Laois, Kildare, and Offaly, the perceived sing-song of Cork and Kerry, to the soft accents of Mayo and Galway.

Historically the Dublin City and county area, parts of Wicklow and Louth, came under heavy exclusive influence from the first English settlements (known as The Pale). It remained until Independence from Britain as the biggest concentration of English influence in the whole island.

Some Cork accents have a unique lyrical intonation. Every sentence typically ends in the trademark elongated tail-off on the last word. In Cork heavier emphasis yet is put on the brrr sound to the letter R. This is usually the dialect in northern parts of Cork City.

Similar to the Cork accent but without the same intonation, Kerry puts even heavier emphasis on the brrr sound to the letter R. For example: the word Forty. Throughout the south this word is pronounced whereby the r exhibits the typified Irish brrr. In Kerry however (especially in rural areas) the roll on the r is enforced with vibrations from the tongue (not unlike Scottish here). "Are you?" becomes a co-joined "A-rrou?" single tongue flutter (esp. in rural areas). This extra emphasis on R is also seen in varying measures through parts of West Limerick and West Cork in closer proximity to Kerry.

Another feature in the Kerry accent is the S before the consonant. True to its Gaelic origins in a manner similar to parts of Connacht "s" maintains the shh sound as in shop or sheep. The word Start becomes "Shtart". Stop becomes Shtop.

Irish Travellers

Irish Travellers have a very distinct accent closely related to a rural Hiberno-English, particularly the English of south-eastern Ireland. Many Irish Travellers who were born in parts of Dublin or Britain have the accent in spite of it being strikingly different from the local accents in those regions. They also have their own language, Shelta, which strongly links in with their dialect/accent of English.

North America

North American English is a collective term for the dialects of the United States and Canada; it does not include the varieties of Caribbean English spoken in the West Indies.

 Rhoticity: Most North American English accents differ from Received Pronunciation and some other British dialects by being rhotic; the rhotic consonant  is pronounced before consonants and at the end of syllables, and the r-colored vowel  is used as a syllable nucleus. (Exceptions are certain traditional accents found in eastern New England, New York City, and the Southern United States, plus African-American English.)
  Mergers before : R-coloring has led to some vowel mergers before historic  that do not happen in most other native dialects. Other mergers before  occur in various North American dialects.
(In North America, the vowel of father has merged with that of lot and bother, see above.) However, related to the trap–bath split, North American dialects have a feature known as /æ/ tensing.

The United States does not have a concrete 'standard' accent in the same way that Britain has Received Pronunciation. Nonetheless, a form of speech known to linguists as General American is perceived by many Americans to be "accent-less", meaning a person who speaks in such a manner does not appear to be from anywhere in particular. The region of the United States that most resembles this is the central Midwest, specifically eastern Nebraska (including Omaha and Lincoln), southern and central Iowa (including Des Moines), parts of Missouri, Indiana, Ohio and western Illinois (including Peoria and the Quad Cities, but not the Chicago area).

Canada

Three major dialect areas can be found in Canada: Western/Central Canada, the Maritimes, and Newfoundland.

The phonology of West/Central Canadian English, also called General Canadian, is broadly similar to that of the Western US, except for the following features:
This feature is known as Canadian raising.
 The short a of bat is more open than almost everywhere else in North America . This phenomenon has been labelled the Canadian Shift.
The pronunciation of certain words shows a British influence.

Words like drama, pajamas/pyjamas, pasta tend to have  rather than ~.

United States

West Indies and Bermuda
For discussion, see:
Bahamian English
Barbadian English
Bequia English
Bermudian English
Caribbean English
Jamaican English
Saban English
Trinidadian English

Oceania

Australia

Australian English is relatively homogeneous when compared to British and American English. There is however some regional variation between the states, particularly in regard to South Australia, Victoria, Queensland, Northern Territory and Western Australia.

Three main varieties of Australian English are spoken according to linguists: Broad Australian, General Australian and Cultivated Australian. They are part of a continuum, reflecting variations in accent. They can, but do not always reflect the social class, education and urban or rural background of the speaker.

 Australian Aboriginal English refers to the various varieties of the English language used by Indigenous Australians. These varieties, which developed differently in different parts of Australia, vary along a continuum, from forms close to General Australian to more nonstandard forms. There are distinctive features of accent, grammar, words and meanings, as well as language use.
 The furthest extent of the Aboriginal dialect is Australian Kriol language, which is not mutually intelligible with General Australian English.
 On the Torres Strait Islands, a distinctive dialect known as Torres Strait English is spoken.
In words like "chance", "plant", "branch", "sample" and "demand", the vast majority of Australians use the short /æ/ vowel from the word "cat". In South Australian English however there is a high proportion of people who use the broad /aː/ vowel from the word "cart" in these words.
 Centring diphthongs, which are the vowels that occur in words like ear, beard and air, sheer. In Western Australian English there is a tendency for centring diphthongs to be pronounced as full diphthongs. Those in the eastern states will tend to pronounce "fear" and "sheer" without any jaw movement, while the westerners would pronounce them like "fia" and "shia", respectively which slightly resembles South African English but in a dialect different from New Zealand English.

New Zealand

The New Zealand accent is most similar to Australian accents (particularly those of Victoria, Tasmania, New South Wales and South Australia) but is distinguished from these accents by the presence of three "clipped" vowels, slightly resembling South African English. New Zealand pronunciations are often popularly represented outside New Zealand by writing "fish and chips" as "fush and chups", "yes" as "yiss", "sixty-six" as "suxty-sux". Scottish English influence is most evident in the southern regions of New Zealand, notably Dunedin. Another difference between New Zealand and Australian English is the length of the vowel in words such as "dog", and "job" which are longer than in Australian English which shares the short and staccato pronunciation shared with British English. There is also a tendency in New Zealand English, also found in some but not all Australian English, to add a schwa between some grouped consonants in words, such that — for example — "shown" and "thrown" may be pronounced "showun" and "throwun".

Geographical variations appear slight, and mainly confined to individual special local words. One group of speakers, however, hold a recognised place as "talking differently": the regions of Otago and especially Southland, both in the south of the South Island, harbour a "Celtic fringe" of people speaking with what is known as the "Southland burr" in which R is pronounced with a soft burr, particularly in words that rhyme with 'nurse'. The area formed a traditional repository of immigration from Scotland. Some sections of the main urban areas of Auckland and Wellington also show a stronger influence of Pacific island (e.g., Samoan) pronunciations than most of the country.

The trilled 'r' is also used by some Māori, who may also pronounce 't' and 'k' sounds without aspiration, striking other English speakers as similar to 'd' and 'g'. This is also encountered in South African English, especially among Afrikaans speakers.

Norfolk Island and Pitcairn
The English spoken in the isolated Pacific islands of Norfolk and Pitcairn shows evidence of the islands' long isolation from the world. In the case of Pitcairn, the local creole (Pitkern) shows strong evidence of its rural English 19th century origins, with an accent which has traces of both the English southwest and Geordie. The Norfolk Island equivalent, Norfuk, was greatly influenced in its development by Pitkern. The accents heard in the islands when English is used are similarly influenced but in a much milder way. In the case of Norfolk Island, Australian English is the primary influence, producing an accent which is like a softened version of an Australian accent. The Pitcairn accent is for the most part largely indistinguishable from the New Zealand accent.

Africa and the Atlantic

South Atlantic

Falkland Islands

The Falkland Islands have a large non-native born population, mainly from Britain, but also from Saint Helena. In rural areas, the Falkland accent tends to be stronger. The accent has resemblances to both Australia-NZ English, and that of Norfolk in England, and contains a number of Spanish loanwords.

Saint Helena
"Saints", as Saint Helenan islanders are called, have a variety of different influences on their accent. To outsiders, the accent has resemblances to the accents of South Africa, Australia, and New Zealand.

"Saint" is not just a different pronunciation of English, it also has its own distinct words. So 'bite' means spicy, as in full of chillies; 'us' is used instead of 'we' ('us has been shopping'); and 'done' is used to generate a past tense, hence 'I done gorn fishing' ('I have been fishing').

Television is a reasonably recent arrival there, and is only just beginning to have an effect. American terms are becoming more common, e.g. 'chips' for crisps.

Southern Africa

South Africa

South Africa has 11 official languages, one of which is English. Accents vary significantly between ethnic and language groups. Home-language English speakers (Black, White, Indian and Coloured) in South Africa have an accent that generally resembles British Received Pronunciation (modified with varying degrees of Germanic inflection due to Afrikaans).

The Coloured community is generally bilingual; however, English accents are strongly influenced by primary mother-tongue (Afrikaans or English). A range of accents can be seen, with the majority of Coloureds showing a strong Afrikaans inflection.  Similarly, Afrikaners (and Cape Coloureds), both descendant of mainly Dutch settlers, tend to pronounce English phonemes with a strong Afrikaans inflection. The English accents of both related groups are significantly different and easily distinguishable (primarily because of prevalent code-switching among the majority of Coloured English speakers, particularly in the Western Cape of South Africa). The range of accents found among English-speaking Coloureds (from the distinctive "Cape Flats or Coloured English"  to the standard "colloquial" South African English accent) are of special interest. Geography and education levels play major roles therein.

Black Africans generally speak English as a second language, and accent is strongly influenced by mother-tongue (particularly Bantu languages). However, urban middle-class black Africans have developed an English accent, with similar inflection as first-language English speakers.  Within this ethnic group variations exist: most Nguni (Xhosa, Zulu, Swazi and Ndebele) speakers have a distinct accent, with the pronunciation of words like 'the' and 'that' as would 'devil' and 'dust', respectively; and words like 'rice' as 'lice'. This may be as a result of the inadequacy of 'r' in the languages. Sotho (Tswana, Northern Sotho and Southern Sotho) speakers have a similar accent, with slight variations. Tsonga and Venda speakers have very similar accents with far less intonation than Ngunis and Sothos. Some Black speakers have no distinction between the 'i' in determine and the one in decline, pronouncing it similarly to the one in 'mine'.

Black, Indian and Coloured students educated in former Model C schools or at formerly white tertiary institutions will generally adopt a similar accent to their white English-home-language speaking classmates. Code-switching and the "Cape Flats" accent are becoming popular among white learners in public schools within Cape Town.

South African accents also vary between major cities (particularly Cape Town, Durban and Johannesburg) and provinces (regions). Accent variation is also observed within respective citiesfor instance, Johannesburg, where the northern suburbs (Parkview, Parkwood, Parktown North, Saxonwold, etc.) tend to be less strongly influenced by Afrikaans. These suburbs are more affluent and populated by individuals with tertiary education and higher incomes. The accents of native English speakers from the southern suburbs (Rosettenville, Turffontein, etc.) tend to be more strongly influenced by Afrikaans. These suburbs are populated by tradesmen and factory workers, with lower incomes. The extent of Afrikaans influence is explained by the fact that Afrikaans urbanisation would historically have been from failed marginal farms or failing economies in rural towns, into the southern and western suburbs of Johannesburg. The western suburbs of Johannesburg (Newlands, Triomf, which has now reverted to its old name Sophiatown, Westdene, etc.) are predominantly Afrikaans speaking. In a similar fashion, people from predominantly or traditionally Jewish areas in the Johannesburg area (such as Sandton, Linksfield or Victory Park) may have accents influenced by Yiddish or Hebrew ancestry.

South African English accent, across the spectrum, is non-rhotic.

Examples of South African accents (obtained from http://accent.gmu.edu)
Native English: Male (Cape Town, South Africa)
Native English: Female (Cape Town, South Africa)
Native English: Male (Port Elizabeth, South Africa)
Native English: Male (Nigel, South Africa)
Afrikaans (Primary): Female (Pretoria, South Africa)
Afrikaans (Primary): Male (Pretoria, South Africa)
Afrikaans (Primary): Male (Pretoria, South Africa)
Northern Sotho (Primary): Female (Polokwane, South Africa)

Additional samples of South African accents and dialects can be found at http://web.ku.edu/~idea/africa/southafrica/southafrica.htm

Regardless of regional and ethnic differences (in accents), South African English accent is sometimes confused with Australian (or New Zealand) English by British and American English speakers.

Zimbabwe

In Zimbabwe, formerly Rhodesia, native English speakers (mainly the white and Coloured minority) have a similar speech pattern to that of South Africa. Hence those with high degrees of Germanic inflection would pronounce 'Zimbabwe' as zim-bah-bwi, as opposed to the African pronunciation zeem-bah-bweh. Zimbwabwean accents also vastly vary, with some Black Africans sounding British while others will have a much stronger accent influenced by their mother tongues, usually this distinction is brought about by where speakers grew up and the school attended. For example, most people that grew up in and around Harare have a British sounding accent while those in the rural areas have a more "pidgin-english" sort of accent

Example of a Zimbabwean English accent (obtained from http://accent.gmu.edu)
Shona (Primary): Female (Bulawayo, Zimbabwe)

Namibia
Namibian English tends to be strongly influenced by South African English. Most Namibians that grew up in and around the capital city (Windhoek) have developed an English accent while those in the rural areas have an accent strongly influenced by their mother tongue particularly Bantu languages.

Nigeria
Nigerian English varies by constituent units. The accents are influenced by the various mother tongues of the Nigerian constituent units.

Asia

India and South Asia

A number of distinct dialects of English are spoken in South Asia. There are many languages spoken in South Asia like Nepali, Hindi, Punjabi, Rajasthani, Sindhi, Balochi, Pashto, Assamese, Bengali, Gujarati, Kannada, Kashmiri, Marathi, Odia, Maithili, Malayalam, Sinhala, Tamil, Telugu, Tulu, Urdu and many more, creating a variety of accents of English. Accents originating in this part of the world tend to display several distinctive features, including:
 syllable-timing, in which a roughly equal time is allocated to each syllable. Akin to the English of Singapore and Malaysia. (Elsewhere, English speech timing is based predominantly on stress);
 "sing-song" pitch (somewhat reminiscent of those of Welsh English).
 retroflexion of "t" and "d"

Philippines

Philippine English employs a rhotic accent that originated from the time when it was first introduced by the Americans during the colonization period in an attempt to replace Spanish as the dominant political language. As there are no /f/ or /v/ sounds in most native languages in the Philippines, [p] is used as an alternative to /f/ as [b] is to /v/. Similarly, /θ/ is often changed to [t] and /ð/ to [d]. Hence, "three" becomes /tri/ while "that" becomes /dat/. This feature is consistent with many other Malayo-Polynesian languages. In addition, /z/ is often devoiced to [s], whereas [ʒ] is often devoiced to [ʃ] or affricated to [dʒ], so words like "zoo", "measure", and "beige" may be pronounced [su], [ˈmɛʃoɾ], and [beɪdʒ].

Apart from the frequent inability to pronounce certain fricatives (e.g., [f], [v], [θ], [ð], [z], [ʒ]), in reality, there is no single Philippine English accent. This is because native languages influence spoken English in different ways throughout the archipelago. For instance, those from Visayas usually interchange the sounds /e/ and /i/ as well as /o/ and /u/ because the distinction between those phonemes is not very pronounced in Visayan languages.

People from the northern Philippines may pronounce /r/ as a strong trill instead of a tap, which is more commonly used in the rest of the Philippines, as the trill is a feature of the Ilocano language. Ilocano people also generally pronounce the schwa sound /ə/ better than other Filipinos because they use a similar sound in their native language that is missing from many other Philippine languages.

Hong Kong

The accent of English spoken in Hong Kong follows mainly British, with rather strong influence from Cantonese on the pronunciations of a few consonants and vowels, and sentence grammar and structure.

Malaysia

Malay is the lingua franca of Malaysia, a federation of former British colonies and similar dependencies. English is a foreign language with no official status, but it is commonly learnt as a second or third language.

The Malaysian accent appears to be a melding of British, Chinese, Tamil and Malay influences.

Many Malaysians adopt different accents and usages depending on the situation; for example, an office worker may speak with less colloquialism and with a more British accent on the job than with friends or while out shopping.

syllable-timing, where speech is timed according to syllable, akin to the English of the Indian Subcontinent. (Elsewhere, speech is usually timed to stress.)
 A quick, staccato style, with "puncturing" syllables and well-defined, drawn out tones.
 Non-rhoticity, like most varieties of English language in England.
 Depending on how colloquial the situation is: many discourse particles, or words inserted at the end of sentences that indicate the role of the sentence in discourse and the mood it conveys, like "lah", "leh", "mah", "hor", etc.

Singapore

Singapore is effectively a multilingual nation. The Singapore government recognises four official languages: English, Malay, Mandarin Chinese, and Tamil.

Students in primary and secondary schools learning English as the language of instruction also learn a second language called their "Mother Tongue" by the Ministry of Education, where they are taught Mandarin Chinese, Malay or Tamil. A main point to note is while "Mother Tongue" generally refers to the first language (L1) overseas, in Singapore, it is used by the Ministry of Education to denote the traditional language of one's ethnic group, which sometimes can be their second language (L2).

There are two main types of English spoken in Singapore – Standard Singapore English and Singlish. Singlish is more widely spoken than standard English. It has a very distinctive tone and sentence structure which are both strongly influenced by Malay and the many varieties of Chinese spoken in the city.

A 2005 census showed that around 30% of Singaporeans speak English as their main language at home.

There are many foreigners working in Singapore. 36% of the population in Singapore are foreigners and foreigners make up 50% of the service sector. Therefore, it is very common to encounter service staff who are not fluent in English. Most of these staff speak Mandarin Chinese. Those who do not speak Mandarin Chinese tend to speak either broken English or Singlish, which they have learnt from the locals.

Antarctica
Phonetic change in the English spoken at a base in Antarctica has also been registered. This has been referred to as the start of a new accent.

See also
American English
British English
English phonology
Survey of English Dialects
List of dialects of the English language
International Dialects of English Archive
International Phonetic Alphabet chart for English dialects
Koiné language

Notes

References

Bibliography

External links
The Speech Accent Archive 1254 audio samples of people with various accents reading the same paragraph.
Sounds Familiar? — Listen to examples of regional accents and dialects from across the UK on the British Library's 'Sounds Familiar' website
'Hover & Hear' Accents of English from Around the World , listen and compare side by side instantaneously.
International Dialects of English Archive
English Accents and Dialects Searchable free-access archive of 681 speech samples, England only, wma format with linguistic commentary
Britain's crumbling ruling class is losing the accent of authority An article on the connection of class and accent in the UK, its decline, and the spread of Estuary English
The Telsur Project Homepage of the telephone survey of North American English accents
Pittsburgh Speech & Society A site for non-linguists, by Barbara Johnstone of Carnegie Mellon University
Linguistic Geography of Pennsylvania by Claudio Salvucci
Phillyspeak A newspaper article on Philadelphia speech
J.C. Wells' English Accents course Includes class handouts describing Cockney, Scottish, Australian, and Scouse, among other things.
Evaluating English Accents Worldwide
Do You Speak American? A series of web pages by PBS that attempts to discuss the differences between dialects in the United States
Language by Video Short videos demonstrating differences in English accents around the world.

 Regional accents of English
English phonology
Shibboleths